Libby as a feminine given name is typically a diminutive form of Elizabeth, which is less commonly spelled 'Libbie' or 'Libi'.

In recent years, it has been used as a shortened version of the name Liberty. 

As a surname, it can also be spelled 'Libbey'.
 
Libby or Libbie may refer to:

People with the name

Given name

Libby or Libbie 
 Libby Davies (born 1953), Canadian member of parliament
 Libby Gill (born 1954), American motivational writer, speaker and coach
 Libby Gleeson (born 1950), Australian writer
 Libby Fischer Hellmann, American crime fiction writer
 Libbie Hickman (born 1965), American former long-distance runner
 Libbie Hyman (1888–1969), American zoologist
 Libby Lane (born 1966), British Anglican bishop
 Libby Larsen (born 1950), American classical composer
 Libby Morris (born 1930), Canadian comic actress
 Libby Munro (born 1981), Australian actress
 Libby Potter, British reporter
 Libby Rees (born 1995), British author
 Libby Riddles (born 1956), first woman to win the Iditarod Trail Sled Dog Race
 Libby Szabo, American politician, member of the Colorado House of Representatives since 2011

Elizabeth or Lisbeth 
 Libby Clegg (born 1990), Scottish Paralympic sprinter
 Elizabeth Bacon Custer (1842–1933),  wife of General George Armstrong Custer, nicknamed "Libbie"
 Libby Hathorn (born 1943), Australian writer and poet
 Libby Holman (1904–1971), American torch singer and actress
 Libby Mettam, Australian politician elected 2014, former journalist
 Libby Mitchell (born 1940), American politician
 Libby Pataki (born 1950), wife of former New York Governor George Pataki
 Libby Purves (born 1950), British journalist
 Libby Roderick (born c. 1958), American singer/songwriter, poet and activist
 Libbie Schrader, American singer-songwriter
 Libby Tanner (born 1970), Australian actress
 Libby Thompson (1855–1953), American prostitute, dance hall girl and madam
 Libby Titus (born 1947), American singer/songwriter born Elizabeth Jurist
 Libby Trickett (born 1985), Australian world-record holding swimmer and Olympic champion

Surname 
 Aaron Libby (born 1983), American politician
 Bill Libby (1927–1984), American sports author
 Charles Libby (1844–1915), American politician and lawyer
 Charles Thornton Libby (1861–1948), American author, historian, genealogist and lawyer
 Frederick Libby (1891–1970), first American flying ace of World War I
 George D. Libby (1919–1950), U.S. Army soldier who received the Medal of Honor
 Jake Libby (born 1993), English cricketer
 Nate Libby, American politician, member of the Maine House of Representatives beginning 2012
 Scooter Libby (born 1950), former chief of staff (2001–2005) to Vice President Dick Cheney
 Willard Libby (1908–1980), American chemist
Grace Libby Vollmer (1884–1977), née Libby, American painter.

Fictional characters 
 Libby (Lost), a minor character on the television drama Lost
 Libby, Jonah's brief girlfriend who is also deaf in Disney Channel series Andi Mack
 Libby, from the 2015 Pixar film The Good Dinosaur
 Libby Chessler, antagonist on the ABC/WB sitcom Sabrina, the Teenage Witch
 Libby Folfax, a female black character on the Nickelodeon 3D computer-animated television series The Adventures of Jimmy Neutron: Boy Genius and the 2001 film Jimmy Neutron: Boy Genius
 Libby Fox, in the British soap opera EastEnders
 Libby Jeffries, in the New Zealand soap opera Shortland Street
 Libby Kennedy, in the Australian soap opera Neighbours
 Libby Lawrence, a DC Comics superheroine, the first Liberty Belle (comics)
 Andrew Jackson Libby, a recurring character in Robert A. Heinlein's Future History series
 Libbie the Cyber Oryx, a proposed mascot submitted in LibreOffice's mascot competition
 Libby Masters, wife of the main character in the television show Masters of Sex
 Libby, a character in the animated television series Grojband
 Libby Stein-Torres, a recurring character in Disney Channel series The Ghost and Molly McGee

See also
 Senator Libby (disambiguation)

English-language feminine given names
Hypocorisms